Slowdeath is an album by American indie hip hop artist Doseone. It was released in 1999. The album consists of two extended tracks.

The album features contributions from Doseone's bandmates in the group Clouddead; Odd Nosdam providing additional sounds and Why? providing the cover art.

Track listing
 Untitled (30:53)
 Untitled (28:31)

References

1999 albums
Doseone albums